Royal North of Ireland Yacht Club is in Cultra, County Down, Northern Ireland on the south shore of Belfast Lough

Refurbishment
In October 2010, a major club refurbishment was started with a total expenditure of £300,000. The objective of this refurbishment was the improvement and upgrading of the Club facilities and the enhancement of the club environment.

References

Royal yacht clubs
Yacht clubs in Northern Ireland
Sports clubs in County Down
Organisations based in Northern Ireland with royal patronage
Organisations based in the United Kingdom with royal patronage
1899 establishments in Ireland